The 2017–18 Botola, also known as Botola Maroc Telecom for sponsorship reasons, is the 61st season of the Premier League and the 7th under its new format of Moroccan Pro League, the top Moroccan professional league for association football clubs, since its establishment in 1956. The season started on 8 September 2017 and ended on 21 May 2018.

Wydad Athletic Club came into the season as defending champions of the 2016–17 season. Rapide Oued Zem and Racing de Casablanca entered as the two promoted teams from the 2016–17 GNF 2.

On May 12, 2018, IR Tanger won the Botola Pro after a 2-1 victory against Moghreb Tétouan. The IR Tanger club won the championship for the first time after being runner-up to the title in 1989-90 season.

Teams

Stadium and locations

Number of teams by regions

Personnel and kits 

1. On the back of shirt.
2. On the sleeves.
3. On the shorts.
 Maroc Telecom is a sponsor for all the league's teams.
 Additionally, referee kits are made by Adidas.

Managerial changes

League table

Standings

Results

Season statistics

Top goalscorers

Top Assists

Hat-tricks

(H) – Home ; (A) – Away

Annual awards 
The UMFP (Union Marocaine des Footballeurs Professionnels), in partnership with the Royal Moroccan Football Federation, organized the Night of Stars Award in its 4th edition, which celebrated the brilliants of the Botola Pro for the 2017/18 season.

See also
2017 Coupe du Trône
2017–18 Botola 2
2018 CAF Champions League
2018 CAF Confederation Cup

References

External links 
 Fédération Royale Marocaine de Football

Botola seasons
Morocco
2017–18 in Moroccan football